Tobacco-free college campuses are colleges and universities that have implemented policies prohibiting the use of tobacco products at all indoor and outdoor campus locations. Tobacco is known to be harmful to the health of smokers, bystanders, and the environment. Since this issue was first recognized, colleges have been creating policies for tobacco use on campus in an effort to improve health standards, provide more enjoyable campus conditions, and to reduce the negative environmental effects of tobacco.

Some schools simply prohibit smoking on campus, while other schools have prohibited all forms of tobacco, cannabis, and other substances. Each college has a slightly different tobacco policy, ranging in strictness and severity. Simply banning tobacco use on campus is not the only way colleges are working to prevent tobacco use. Many schools have cessation programs and continual support for students who are trying to stop using tobacco.

History 

In 1986, secondhand smoke was first recognized to be a possible health risk by the Surgeon General of the United States. Four years later, in 1990, San Luis Obispo, California, became the first city in the world to completely ban smoking in all public places. In 1993, secondhand smoke was officially labeled as a deadly carcinogen by the EPA. In 1998, The State of California followed San Luis Obispo's lead, banning smoking in all public places statewide. In 2006, 20 years after Surgeon General first recognized the potential risks of secondhand smoke, they released an official report condemning secondhand smoke to be undeniably harmful to health in any form. In 2012, they released another report, which focused on the enhanced effect smoking has on youth. The same year, the first public advertising campaign was launched, showing people who had terrible diseases which were directly caused by smoking.

One of the primary concerns with tobacco has been its exposure to the youth. According to the Center for Disease Control and Prevention, 9 out of 10 smokers tried their first cigarette before the age of 18 and 98% of smokers began before the age of 26. Considering in 2012 79% of college students were aged 18–24, and in 2018 61% of college students were projected to be 25 and under, a recipe for continued use of tobacco products by our youth is a pressing issue.

Many colleges have also chosen to restrict the use of electronic smoking devices, such as e-cigarettes. As of April 1, 2020 there are now at least 2,490 100% smokefree campus sites. Of these, 2,065 are 100% tobacco-free and 2,097 prohibit e-cigarette use. These policies are part of the tobacco control movement to reduce cigarette smoking among college students and to protect people on campus from secondhand smoke.

Policies overview 
A tobacco-free campus program is much more than simply drafting a policy, getting it passed, and implementing it. It is important to raise awareness about the reasons why a campus is going tobacco-free so the programs also include a large educational component. Program work should also include cessation services, or services that help interested tobacco users to quit. While the actual tobacco-free campus policy is arguably the most important piece of this work, education and cessation support policy efforts and work to further change the tobacco norms on campus.

A tobacco-free policy limits or eliminates the use of any tobacco product, including, but not limited to, cigarettes, cigars, cigarillos, mini-cigars, hookah, spit tobacco, snus, and other smokeless products. It also often includes innovations in smoke or tobacco products, such as electronic cigarettes. The primary concern of a tobacco-free policy is overall health and ethical behavior of the student body. Also, a comprehensive tobacco-free program may also address tobacco sales, marketing, sponsorship and investments.

Policies by school 

The School of Medicine of Central and Southern Illinois became Tobacco-Free in 2006 with the mission in mind over viewing an improvement in the health and well-being of the people and communities that they serve.

University of California 
All of the University of California (UC) campuses went tobacco free on January 1, 2004. The UC system states their reason for going 100% tobacco free as "While the use of tobacco is a personal choice, the health hazards related to smoking and exposure to second- and third-hand smoke are well-documented. These hazards can affect not only the smoker, but also the nonsmoker who is exposed to the smoke.As a leader in health care and environmental practices, the university recognizes its responsibility to exercise leadership through the creation of a smoke and tobacco-free environment for all students, employees and visitors at all UC campuses, medical centers and facilities."

Statewide policies 
Some states such as Louisiana have chosen to institute a statewide smoke-free policy for all educational institutions. Other states such as California have issued narrower bans.

Washington State Colleges

There is a total of 17 college campuses across Washington State that institute a 100% Tobacco-free campus. The rest are in the process of implementing a 100% tobacco-free policy from a smoke-free or type of tobacco-free policy, or from no policy to 100% tobacco-free policy. These campuses range from Community Colleges to Public Universities and Private Universities as well. Most schools already have a smoke-free policy and are moving towards a 100% tobacco free-policy.

Florida State Colleges

There is a total of 41 college campuses in Florida that institute a 100% smoke-free college campus. Their policy entails 100% ban on the use of conventional cigarettes. Areas of the policy include the following; campuses, parking lots, college-sponsored off-campus events and campus owned vehicles. Depending on the policy, e-cigarette use may be prohibited. The type of college ranges from Community Colleges to Public Universities and Private Universities as well. While starting with this smoke-free policy, the goal is to move towards a 100% tobacco-free campus.

California Community Colleges 
In May 2018, the Board of Governors voted to make all California Community Colleges tobacco free. A number of California Community Colleges had already made this policy change on their campus or had been working toward the goal of a 100% smoke and tobacco free policy. The rationale of the Board of Governors to pass this included reasons such as: tobacco is responsible for about 1 in 5 deaths, there is no safe level of secondhand smoke, and smoking on campus can lead to secondhand smoke entering buildings via open doors or windows and exposure when walking by a smoker.

California State Universities 
In 2016, Governor Jerry Brown vetoed legislation that would have banned smoking on all California State University (CSU) campuses because he believed that these campuses could make their own individual policies. In April 2017, the CSU Chancellor's office issued an executive order making all CSU campuses smoke and tobacco free. The California State University system states that they agree with the UC system on their rationale for the 100% tobacco free campuses.

Effectiveness 
In recent years, tobacco free campuses has been forefronted by the American Cancer Society's Tobacco-free Generation Campus Initiative. In cooperation with the CVS Health Foundation, since its foundation in 2016 the ACS has provided over 97 grants up to $20,000 to colleges across the country.

The rising trend of university student smoking in the 1990s has declined in recent years. Between 1993 to 1997, the percent of US students who smoked has increased from 22% to 28%. However, between 2002 to 2016, the percentage of US college students who smoked has decreased by 47.4%. For smoking over the past 30 days, the percentage is 10.4%, while for the past 12 months, the percentage is 12.2%.

Cessation programs vs. restricted availability 
There are two primary devices utilized to reduce tobacco use on college campuses. One is to remove the option to smoke, and the other is to educate, inform and introduce cessation programs influencing users to quit. A 2005 study found that restriction of tobacco distribution and restriction of smoking within 20 feet of entrances were not as effective as smoking cessation programs in decreasing college students' smoking. When prevention-oriented education was present on college campuses, students were 23% less likely to smoke compared to their peers who were not exposed to this kind of education. This can be further substantiated by a more recent study which took place from September 2013 to May 2014. The study was conducted in which 1309 students at eight California Universities were surveyed periodically to assimilate the correlation of stricter tobacco policies compared to exposure of college students to secondhand cigarette smoke. The surveys statistics indicated as policy strictness increased, exposure to secondhand smoke decreased. After 30 days, student surveys showed smoking exposure drop from 81% to 38% as anti-tobacco policies strengthened. Percentages for entirely tobacco-free campuses ran as low as 3% after 6 months.

Cessation support 
Many schools are helping students quit using tobacco on campus by providing counseling, online support, and nicotine replacements such as gum, patches, and lozenges. A 2014 survey found that 55% of responding Student Health Center staff asked their patients about their tobacco use at every visit, and 80% offered counseling to students who wished to quit. According to this survey, 54% of health care providers were specifically trained in effective intervention.

Overall student health 
Although it is quite clear from numerous surveys implementing tobacco-free policies highly reduces students exposure to secondhand smoke on campuses, it may have less of an overall affect than perceived. In Fall of 2006 an online survey of 4,160 students from 10 different colleges was conducted to acquire data of when and where students were exposed to cigarette smoke. The top three answers by students were restaurants/bars (65%), at home (55%) and in a car (38%). These percentages indicate the vast majority of secondhand smoke exposure experienced by students actually occurs off campus property. When taking this into consideration, it can be suggested that although any secondhand smoke is bad, anti-tobacco policies are more beneficial to active smokers.

Success of the college initiative program and need for continued support 
Tobacco policies seem to be less effective in areas of poverty and in community colleges. In 2014, an observational study performed by numerous tobacco truth organizations indicated areas where progress was more inhibited than others. Data collected indicated only 19% of community colleges in the U.S. had implemented a comprehensive tobacco-free policy and only one-third of historically black colleges. In an effort to improve these low statistics, an effort called the College Initiative Program was Established which created a 5-step program which included 135 institutions to help create successful tobacco-free policies. By 2017, it was found that 87% of the 135 participating colleges had either started or finished in creating successful anti-tobacco/smoking policies. With this research, it can be seen that community colleges and poverty-stricken locations simply lack funding and opportunity to develop educational policies and programs. A study published in 2020 has found that social norms, smoking status, second-hand smoke exposure, and sociodemographic factors all play a role in determining the attitudes and behaviours of students, staff and faculty towards smoke-free campuses and in turn can affect the success of tobacco-free campus initiatives.

References

External links
 California Tobacco Free Colleges
 California Youth Advocacy Network
 Americans for Nonsmokers' Rights
 Tobacco-Free College Campus Initiative
 American Lung Association Tobacco-Free Colleges and Universities

Smoking in the United States
Tobacco control